Chedima is a monotypic genus of Moroccan palp-footed spiders containing the single species, Chedima purpurea. It was first described by Eugène Louis Simon in 1873, and is only found in Morocco.

See also
 List of Palpimanidae species

References

Monotypic Araneomorphae genera
Palpimanidae
Spiders of Africa